José Pastor Fernández Beita (born 22 April 1963 in Pérez Zeledón Canton) is a former football player in the National League of Costa Rica during the 1980s.

Club career
Fernández started his career in 1983 at second division Pérez Zeledón and later played for Cartaginés, Alajuelense and San Carlos.
He retired from the game after 5 seasons in Costa Rica's Premier Division at the age of only 28.

International career

Moment of glory
He became a national sports hero during the 1990 World Cup qualification, when he headed in the winning goal against El Salvador; that victory qualified Costa Rica for its inaugural World Cup.

During the previous games Evaristo Coronado had been the hero of the Costa Rican squad with his goals, most of which were headers. For the final game, however, Coronado was injured and Fernandez was picked as his replacement. Just as Coronado had been doing during the qualifying round, Fernandez headed in the winning goal.

From hero to zero
But he was not chosen by coach Velibor Milutinovic to go with the team to Italy, a decision he took very badly, feeling unappreciated by the Football Association as well. In protest, he gave up the sport after two years at Alajuelense and one at San Carlos and disappeared from the football scene. Coronado was also dropped for the World Cup, but he did continue his career.  This contrast highlighted Fernandez's decision as an impetuous one, and although many Costa Ricans remember his name and appreciate his goal, few can mention his other accomplishments.

International goals
Scores and results list Costa Rica's goal tally first.

Retirement
After retiring he went into American clothing and later in sportswear.

He is currently working as a P.E teacher in a Costa Rican High School

Personal life
Born in San Isidro de El General, his parents are Aricelda Beita and Ezequías Fernández. His brother Freddy has also played for the Costa Rica national team.

He is married and has three children.

References

1963 births
Living people
People from Pérez Zeledón (canton)
Association football forwards
Costa Rican footballers
Costa Rica international footballers
Municipal Pérez Zeledón footballers
C.S. Cartaginés players
L.D. Alajuelense footballers
A.D. San Carlos footballers
Liga FPD players
CONCACAF Championship-winning players